An astrophysical jet is an astronomical phenomenon where outflows of ionised matter are emitted as an extended beam along the axis of rotation. When this greatly accelerated matter in the beam approaches the speed of light, astrophysical jets become relativistic jets as they show effects from special relativity.

The formation and powering of astrophysical jets are highly complex phenomena that are associated with many types of high-energy astronomical sources. They likely arise from dynamic interactions within accretion disks, whose active processes are commonly connected with compact central objects such as black holes, neutron stars or pulsars. One explanation is that tangled magnetic fields are organised to aim two diametrically opposing beams away from the central source by angles only several degrees wide  Jets may also be influenced by a general relativity effect known as frame-dragging.

Most of the largest and most active jets are created by supermassive black holes (SMBH) in the centre of active galaxies such as quasars and radio galaxies or within galaxy clusters. Such jets can exceed millions of parsecs in length. Other astronomical objects that contain jets include cataclysmic variable stars, X-ray binaries and gamma-ray bursts (GRB). Jets on a much smaller scale (~parsecs) may be found in star forming regions including T Tauri stars and Herbig–Haro objects; these objects are partially formed by the interaction of jets with the interstellar medium. Bipolar outflows may also be associated with protostars, or with evolved post-AGB stars, planetary nebulae and bipolar nebulae.

Relativistic jets

Relativistic jets are beams of ionised matter accelerated close to the speed of light. Most have been observationally associated with central black holes of some active galaxies, radio galaxies or quasars, and also by galactic stellar black holes, neutron stars or pulsars. Beam lengths may extend between several thousand, hundreds of thousands or millions of parsecs. Jet velocities when approaching the speed of light show significant effects of the special theory of relativity; for example, relativistic beaming that changes the apparent beam brightness. 

Massive central black holes in galaxies have the most powerful jets, but their structure and behaviours are similar to those of smaller galactic neutron stars and black holes. These SMBH systems are often called microquasars and show a large range of velocities. SS 433 jet, for example, has a mean velocity of 0.26c. Relativistic jet formation may also explain observed gamma-ray bursts.

Mechanisms behind the composition of jets remain uncertain, though some studies favour models where jets are composed of an electrically neutral mixture of nuclei, electrons, and positrons, while others are consistent with jets composed of positron–electron plasma. Trace nuclei swept up in a relativistic positron–electron jet would be expected to have extremely high energy, as these heavier nuclei should attain velocity equal to the positron and electron velocity.

Rotation as possible energy source
Because of the enormous amount of energy needed to launch a relativistic jet, some jets are possibly  powered by spinning black holes. However, the frequency of high-energy astrophysical sources with jets suggest combinations of different mechanisms indirectly identified with the energy within the associated accretion disk and X-ray emissions from the generating source. Two early theories have been used to explain how energy can be transferred from a black hole into an astrophysical jet:

 Blandford–Znajek process. This theory explains the extraction of energy from magnetic fields around an accretion disk, which are dragged and twisted by the spin of the black hole. Relativistic material is then feasibly launched by the tightening of the field lines.
 Penrose mechanism. Here energy is extracted from a rotating black hole by frame dragging, which was later theoretically proven by Reva Kay Williams to be able to extract relativistic particle energy and momentum, and subsequently shown to be a possible mechanism for jet formation. This effect includes using general relativistic gravitomagnetism.

Relativistic jets from neutron stars

Jets may also be observed from spinning neutron stars. An example is pulsar IGR J11014-6103, which has the largest jet so far observed in the Milky Way, and whose velocity is estimated at 80% the speed of light (0.8c). X-ray observations have been obtained but there is no detected radio signature nor accretion disk. Initially, this pulsar was presumed to be rapidly spinning but later measurements indicate the spin rate is only 15.9 Hz. Such a slow spin rate and lack of accretion material suggest the jet is neither rotation nor accretion powered, though it appears aligned with the pulsar rotation axis and perpendicular to the pulsar's true motion.

Other images

See also
 Accretion disk
 Bipolar outflow
 Blandford–Znajek process
 CGCG 049-033, elliptical galaxy located 600 million light-years from Earth, known for having the longest galactic jet discovered
 List of plasma physics articles
 Gamma-ray burst

References

External links
 NASA – Ask an Astrophysicist: Black Hole Bipolar Jets
 SPACE.com – Twisted Physics: How Black Holes Spout Off
 
 Hubble Video Shows Shock Collision inside Black Hole Jet (Article)

Jet
Plasma physics
Black holes
Jet, Astrophysical